Scissurelloidea is a taxonomic superfamily of minute sea snails, marine gastropod mollusks or micromollusks in the subclass Vetigastropoda.

Taxonomy 
This superfamily consists of two following families (according to the taxonomy of the Gastropoda by Bouchet & Rocroi, 2005):
Family Scissurellidae Gray, 1847
Family Anatomidae McLean, 1989

Geiger (2009) updated two other subfamilies to family level:

Superfamily Scissurelloidea:
 Family Anatomidae
 Family Depressizonidae
 Family Larocheidae
 Family Scissurellidae

References 

 
Vetigastropoda
Taxa named by John Edward Gray